Ned Manning is an Australian playwright, actor and teacher. His film credits include the lead role in Dead End Drive-In (1986), and television credits include The Shiralee and Prisoner, and Brides of Christ. His plays include Us or Them, Milo, Kenny's Coming Home and Close to the Bone. In 2007 Manning played the lead in his own play, Last One Standing, at the Old Fitzroy theatre in Sydney.

At one time the husband of Indigenous Australian artist Bronwyn Bancroft, Manning has since remarried, to theatre director Marion Potts. His children include 2010 New South Wales Young Australian of the Year, Jack Manning Bancroft.

Early life
Ned Manning was born in 1950 and grew up on a property in Coonabarabran, New South Wales.

Playwright and author
Manning's first play, Us or Them, was initially produced at the Childers Street Hall in Canberra on 1 November 1977. It was then re-written and performed in 1984 at the Stables Theatre for the Griffin Theatre Company, where it marked a turning point in Griffin's history as the play's success led to the cast and creatives being paid full professional rates. The play then transferred to the Philip St Theatre and on to the Q Theatre in Penrith.

Milo premiered at the Sydney Theatre Company's Wharf 2 Theatre in October 1984 before productions at the Q Theatre, Theatre Up North in Townsville, Theatre South in Wollongong and regional performances. Milo has been recorded for Radio National, had numerous other productions, and also been published by Currency Press. However a 2001 production in Sydney was panned by the reviewer, who described it as "formulaic and obvious, complete with clunky and unconvincing pat ending", and thought the play should be "put out to pasture". The same year, The Australian's reviewer was more positive, considering the performance to be "passionate and funny. Seven years after it first appeared, it remains one of the best plays written about the bush-city divide".

Manning's next play, Kenny's Coming Home (1991), was performed at the Q Theatre, Penrith and was subsequently recorded for radio on ABC Radio National. The play is centred on a Rugby league footballer, Kenny, who gets caught up in a preselection battle between two of his family members. Kenny's Coming Home included songs by Shane McNamara.

Close to the Bone was written in collaboration with the Indigenous students at the Eora Centre, and first produced there in September 1991. Luck of the Draw was produced by the Darwin Theatre Company in May 1999 and was the first play written by a non-Indigenous writer to be produced by Kooemba Jdarra theatre company in Brisbane. Last One Standing was performed at Sydney theatre the Old Fitzroy in 2007. Manning played lead character Joe in the Old Fitzroy production; The Sydney Morning Herald's reviewer Bryce Hallett described his performance as "terrific", providing the play "with an emotional anchor", but considered the play itself to be predictable, lacking in depth and with "nothing revelatory on offer"; The Sun-Herald reviewer was of a similar view.

Manning has created many works for young audiences. He has prepared scripts for ten works for The Bell Shakespeare Company's Actors at Work program, a travelling community and schools theatrical education initiative. Other plays for young people have included Alice Dreaming, which is one of the Australian Script Centre's anthology of large cast plays. In 2012 he contributed to a Federation Press anthology of monologues for drama students, No Nudity, Weapons or Naked Flames. His play Romeo and Juliet Intensive was nominated for a 2011 AWGIE Award.

In 2012, NewSouth Books published Manning's memoir of a life of school teaching, Playground Duty. Reviewed by the New South Wales Writers' Centre's Amanda Calwell, it was described as showing "the value that one person with drive, ambition and compassion can offer by applying themselves to teaching".

Television, film and directing
Manning's film credits include the lead role in the 1986 Ozploitation film Dead End Drive-In. Based on a Peter Carey short story called "Crabs", Dead End Drive-In is a post-apocalyptic tale about a young man stranded in a small town's drive-in theater when the wheels are stolen off his car. He finds himself amongst a community of misfits trapped at the site, and seeks to break out. The film, directed by Brian Trenchard-Smith, received mixed reviews: Tim Kroenert writing for Eureka Street described it as "Mad Max-lite" and said that the film "is an example of how literality of translation can result in the sacrifice of the story’s essence. The film is fun on its own terms, but much of the nuance and irony that lend 'Crabs' its magic are simply lost". Philippa Hawker writing for The Age said the film was "an energetic, inventively designed, cheerfully satirical and entertaining film", and it is one of American film director Quentin Tarantino's favourites. The film received only a short box-office season; Manning was critical of the distributor Greater Union and worked with the film's other actors to secure separate release in independent cinemas. Manning's other film credits include an appearance in the teen film Looking for Alibrandi. He has also made a short film, Love Bites. Manning's television credits include Bodyline, The Shiralee  and Brides of Christ.

In 1989 Manning directed the Belvoir St Theatre production of a play, Black Cockatoos, about the relationship between a white woman and an Aboriginal man. The script (not by Manning) was criticised by reviewer Angela Bennie, who nevertheless described Manning's direction as delicate and perceptive in places, if also naive and self-conscious.

Personal life and family

Manning married Bronwyn Bancroft, an Indigenous Australian artist, with whom he had two children, including New South Wales Young Australian of the Year for 2010, Jack Manning Bancroft.

Manning remarried to theatre director Marion Potts, with whom he had two children. In 2010, they relocated from Sydney to Melbourne when she was appointed director of the Malthouse Theatre.

References

Further reading
 Scott Murray (ed.) Australian Film 1978–1994: A Survey of Theatrical Features (2nd ed.). Melbourne: Oxford University Press, Australian Film Commission and Cinema Papers. .

External links

Living people
1950 births
Australian male television actors
Australian male stage actors
Australian dramatists and playwrights